Grethe Henriette Kjældgaard Meyer (8 April 1918 – 25 June 2008) was a Danish architect and designer. She had her own design studio from 1960 where she designed product for the home, including cutlery. Her dinnerware designs for Royal Copenhagen had a simple, timeless look. Grethe inspired many female architects and designers, pushing open the door to gender equality in the design industry. Most productive in the late 1940s-70s, she focused not only on her pieces but on the consumers, noting that she wanted to produce high quality items that people could afford. Her work is exhibited internationally.

Biography
Born on 8 April 1918 in Svendborg, she was the daughter of Peter Christian Meyer, a director, and Meta Kirstine Kjældgaard, a pianist. After matriculating from high school, she studied architecture at the Royal Danish Academy of Fine Arts where she was the only female graduate in the class of 1947.

While still at the Academy, she started to work on Bykkebogen, a manual on evolving architectural styles and decor widely used for teaching purposes (1948–70). She then worked as a researcher at the Statens Byggeforskningsinstitut (Danish Institute for Building Research) in Copenhagen from 1955-1960 before establishing her own firm in 1960.

Among her most successful designs are the Boligens Byggeskabe storage system (1954–59), named for the firm for which it was originally designed, which she developed together with Børge Mogensen, and the Stub & Stamme series of drinking glasses (Kastrup Glasværk/Holmegaard, 1958–60) in cooperation with Ibi Trier Mørch. But above all she is remembered for her designs for the Royal Copenhagen porcelain factory, especially her Blåkant (Blue Line) faience dinner service (1965), her Hvidpot (White Pot) porcelain dinner service (1972) and her Ildpot (Fire Pot) ovenware (1976). In 1991, she designed the set of cutlery known as Copenhagen for Georg Jensen.

Meyer had an analytical eye, studying how people interacted within the home, researching eating habits and space limitations. Her influential research led the way into standardising the size of products. Keeping in mind the way people live with her pieces, she used her knowledge and research to create products that were not only beautiful, but also highly usable and practical. She strongly believed that individuals should have fewer items that they could afford but of the best quality. She used her training and knowledge of form, mass and industrial production techniques to produce pieces which were minimalist yet tactile, a characteristic of all Scandinavian design.

Grethe Meyer had her only daughter Dorthe in 1949. Dorthe's father was colleague and fellow architect Bent Salicath, whom Grethe Meyer never married. Opting out on what was considered a woman’s duty at the time, she devoted her life to pursuing a career and to the constant search for functional and aesthetically simple designs. She was modern in her take on family life and her own role as a woman in a design world that was mostly ruled by men, and lived alone with her daughter. As a consequence she was forced to work even harder to fit life as an employed architect with her personal ambitions of obtaining independence as a designer.  

Meyer was a member of the board of the Architects' Association of Denmark (1964–65) and of the Danish Design Council (1977).

1997 Danish Design Award Acceptance Speech
Grethe Meyer’s speech on the occasion of receiving the Danish Design Award, December 8, 1997:

"I think it would be appropriate to explain a little about my method of working. Mostly, I meet new tasks by trying to build on earlier inspirations and ideals, improving them and, where needed, bringing their qualities up to date while preserving what I think is important— namely that the design must be uncomplicated, the product easy and comfortable to use and as simple and anonymous as possible in the expression of its properties. In this way, I think that beauty will present itself—a beauty that gives the people who are using the product a natural pleasure, a pleasure which preferably grows stronger the more the product is used. I would like to quote a line from a hymn:

'If all the kings went forth one day with all their might and fettle, They could not set the smallest leaf to grow upon a nettle.'''

The humility Brorson expresses here is something we designers can carry with us. I must say that the older I get, the more I wonder and feel how fabulous the whole creation of the universe is.

I have a deep, deep admiration, reverence and respect for the powers, forces, call it what you will, that could create our wonderful world.

I get dizzy when I think of it, especially considering that I know how many decisions and how much time it takes just to make a simple, small object, such as a spoon, which is composed of only one material and which only has to fulfill a few functions, and certainly never can or shall grow as a plant or an animal.

When we consider the universe which is continually expanding and evolving, and we try to understand—of course in vain—how infinitely great it is, we know that each of us can’t even be perceived as a tiny little dot.

All the same, I find it very important that each of us put our full endeavor into the work we do, and for us creative individuals to persevere until we reach the core, the essential, the soul of the matter.

Fulfillment of this demand requires both discipline, precision, engagement and complete attention, but also love for the work.

We are not just born with these abilities. They can only be acquired during a lifetime. It can happen in many ways, as for example in fellowship and cooperation with people who are important for our development. Often it begins with our parents, then teachers and other inspiring and charismatic people. These are people to whom you owe something. There is one person in my life that I want to mention: Børge Mogensen, with whom I cooperated on Boligens Byggeskabe. We probably had many common strains in our minds, plus his stubborn axiom: 'Go back to the beginning and start all over again if, at the back of your mind, you know that not all is right in what you are doing.' Working this way was natural to both of us. He was the most creative and artistic designer I have known in our profession. It was a privilege to meet and work with him.

I’m not a painter or a sculptor, although I would have liked to have been both. And as I’m not, I do not translate my intentions into physical specimens or unique pieces. I therefore share this prize with all the artisans, silversmiths, chemists, technicians and other specialists who have understood my thoughts and drawings and turned them into the finished products. They are, or have all been, linked to Royal Copenhagen where it all started or maybe, should I say, some of it got started.

Today, I want to express a strong wish that in the future much more consideration be given to the environment in all areas than has previously been the case. And, of course, also in the field of design in order to safeguard our beautiful but fragile earth—something that my generation, unfortunately, has not been very dedicated to.

And now, as we are assembled in this house [The House of Industry], I will take the liberty of addressing my opinion to the Industries. I recommend that they keep as many jobs in this country as possible, while at the same time making sure to keep good craftsmanship alive, which is essential for the quality of products to be maintained. Thus: Get many more jobs for apprentices, keep and maintain the machinery at the factories and start new, smaller companies. They were the ones that have established the quality of Danish craft and industry in the past.

If this is not heeded, we shall be left one day with an impoverished country, without living companies and a population without opportunities for decent employment opportunities.

Then we can start all over again to rebuild a country that hasn’t developed, but instead has deteriorated and turned into a service industry. We have seen this happen in many places in the world.

Finally, I will thank the Danish Design Center. You have all been so kind and helpful in connection with this event. Lastly, I will turn to the board of directors and say thank you for giving me the prize. Thank you for making me happy."

 Notable works 
 Bla Kant (Blue Line), 1965 
Named for the fine blue line that runs along the edges of the light grey faience, this dinnerware line received the inaugural Danish Industrial Design Prize (ID) in 1965.

 Ildpot (Firepot), 1976 
One of Meyer's best-selling home designs was her Ildpot, a line of earthenware dishes. They were meant to go directly from one's freezer to one's oven and then straight onto the dinner table to save time in the preparation of food and increase time spent enjoying one's company in the home. Before the 1970's, it had not been possible to produce bowls and dishes that could withstand the large temperature change when taking a dish from the freezer and putting it directly into the oven. Meyer studied and tweaked the design of the Firepot to come up with a way to use oven space optimally. Firepot was produced in cordierite, which is a magnesium mineral with a low thermal expansion that endures great changes in environmental temperature without breaking. The pots themselves could not be glazed, but with use over time, they begin to take on an individual dark patina. Meyer was awarded with the Danish Industrial Design Prize in 1976 for the Ildpot designs.

 GM 15 and GM 30 pendant lamps, 1984 
In 2004, The GM 15 and GM 30 lamps were created based on Grethe Meyers original sketches from May 1984. 20 years after their conception, the Danish brand Menu put the 'Grethe Meyer Lamp' into production for the first time. The GM Lamp represents classic Danish industrial design, brought to life from the sketches of one of the masters of the style.

Awards
Among the many awards she received are:
1965: Inaugural Danish Industrial Design (ID) Prize for Blåkant, a faience dinnerware set produced by Royal Copenhagen
1976: Danish Industrial Design (ID) Prize for Ildpot (Firepot'')
1983: Thorvald Bindesbøll Medal
2002: C.F. Hansen Medal

References

External links
Grethe Meyer Design

20th-century Danish architects
Danish designers
Danish women architects
Danish women designers
Danish dinnerware designers
1918 births
2008 deaths
People from Svendborg
Royal Danish Academy of Fine Arts alumni
Recipients of the C.F. Hansen Medal
Recipients of the Thorvald Bindesbøll Medal